Blanche Bingley defeated Amy Tabor 6–2, 6–0 in the All Comers Final, and then defeated the reigning champion Maud Watson 6–3, 6–3 in the challenge round to win the ladies' singles tennis title at the 1886 Wimbledon Championships.

Draw

Challenge round

All Comers'

References

External links

Ladies' Singles
Wimbledon Championship by year – Women's singles
Wimbledon Championships - Singles
Wimbledon Championships - Singles